"Don't Ever Think (Too Much)" is a single by The Zutons. It was later released on the reissue of Who Killed...... The Zutons?.

Track listing

CD Version 1
 Don't Ever Think (Too Much)
 Creepin' And A Crawlin'
 Haunts Me
 Don't Ever Think (Too Much) (Video)

CD Version 2
 Don't Ever Think (Too Much)
 Rumblin' Ramblin'

7" Version
 Don't Ever Think (Too Much)
 Creepin' And A Crawlin'

Charts

References

The Zutons songs
2004 singles
2004 songs
Songs written by Dave McCabe